Monarch is a hamlet in southern Alberta, Canada within the Lethbridge County. It was formerly a village, existing as such from about 1913 to about 1939.

Climate 

Demographics 

See also 
List of communities in Alberta
List of designated places in Alberta
List of former urban municipalities in Alberta
List of hamlets in Alberta

References 

Hamlets in Alberta
Former villages in Alberta
Designated places in Alberta
Lethbridge County